"Devil's Party" is a song by Australian band INXS. It was released in May 2006 as the third single from their eleventh studio album Switch,  which was also the first with new lead singer J.D. Fortune, winner of the Rock Star: INXS competition. 

It received considerable airplay in Canada, reaching number 6 on their Adult Contemporary chart and number 18 on their Rock chart.

Charts

References

INXS songs
2006 singles
Songs written by Andrew Farriss
Songs written by J.D. Fortune
2005 songs
Epic Records singles
Song recordings produced by Guy Chambers